Trentin is a surname. Notable people with the surname include:

Guido Trentin (born 1975), Italian cyclist
Matteo Trentin (born 1989), Italian cyclist
Nicola Trentin (born 1974), Italian long jumper
Pierre Trentin (born 1944), French cyclist

See also
Trentini

Italian-language surnames